Stuart Anthony Hamilton  (born 31 March 1950) is a retired Australian senior public servant and CEO.

Early life
Stuart Hamilton was born in 1950 in Hobart, Tasmania, the son of Murray and Yvonne Hamilton. He attended the University of Tasmania gaining a First Class Honours degree in Arts, majoring in English Language and Literature.  He then attended Magdalen College Oxford University as the Tasmanian Rhodes Scholar for 1971, where he met and married Suzanne Westrop, a classicist  studying at St Hilda’s College. They have two children, Richard (b. 1984) and Lucy (b. 1987). He subsequently attended the Australian National University, gaining a Bachelor of Economics in 1980.

Career
Hamilton joined the Australian public service in 1975. He worked in several departments, notably the Department of the Prime Minister and Cabinet, becoming Deputy Secretary there in 1987. He was closely involved in developing the major changes to ministerial and departmental arrangements announced by Prime Minister Bob Hawke after the 1987 election .

In 1988, Hamilton was appointed Secretary of the Department of Community Services and Health. He stayed on in the role when the Department transitioned to become the Department of Health, Housing and Community Services in 1991.

Between 1993 and 1996, Hamilton was Secretary of the Department of the Environment, Sport and Territories.

When the Howard Government was elected in 1996, Hamilton was one of six departmental secretaries to be sacked from their positions.

From 1996 to 2001 he was Executive Director of the Australian Vice-Chancellors' Committee (now Universities Australia).  In 2001 he became Secretary of the Victorian (State) Department of Education and Training.  From 2003 to 2012 he was CEO of Open Universities Australia.  He retired in February 2012.

He is currently a member of the Council of Deakin University, and a member of the boards of several not for profit organisations including the Accountability Roundtable, the Melbourne Art Foundation, the National Youth Choir of Australia and the Australian Chamber Choir.

Awards and honours
In January 1995, Hamilton was made an Officer of the Order of Australia in recognition of service to public administration and public sector reform.

References

1950 births
Living people
Officers of the Order of Australia
Secretaries of the Australian Government Health Department
Australian Rhodes Scholars